Cerulli may refer to:

 Vincenzo Cerulli (1859–1927), Italian astronomer and founder of the Collurania-Teramo Observatory in Teramo
 Enrico Cerulli (1898–1988), Italian scholar of Somali and Ethiopian studies
 Cerulli (crater), crater in the Ismenius Lacus quadrangle on Mars